Maureen O'Brien is an English actress and author best known for playing the role of Vicki in the BBC science fiction television series Doctor Who, although she has appeared in many other television programmes.

Early life
O'Brien was born in Liverpool. She attended Notre Dame School in that city, as well as the Central School of Speech and Drama in London.

Career

She played the part of Vicki in 38 episodes of Doctor Who from 2 January to 6 November 1965, starring alongside the original Doctor, William Hartnell. Over 40 years later, she reprised the role in several Big Finish Productions Doctor Who audio plays.

After leaving Doctor Who O'Brien found it difficult to find acting work on television, and worked as a supply teacher. Her next role was in the theatre, where she appeared in an Oxford Playhouse production of Volpone with Leo McKern and Leonard Rossiter.

She had a recurring role as Morgan in The Legend of King Arthur (1979) and as unit general manager Elizabeth Straker in the second season of Casualty (1987). She made guest appearances in The Duchess of Duke Street ("Trouble and Strife") (1976), Taggart ("Forbidden Fruit") (1994), Cracker ("The Big Crunch") (1994), A Touch of Frost ("Private Lives") (1999) and Heartbeat. In 1997 she appeared as Kirsten Holiday in "Jack in the Box", episode two of Jonathan Creek.

O'Brien was a member of the Everyman Theatre company.

In the 1970s, she directed a production of Brecht's The Caucasian Chalk Circle at Carleton University in Canada. In 1974, she played Celia in "Panic", an episode of the BBC Radio series The World of Daphne du Maurier. The 1980s saw her teaching acting workshops in the USA. She also made a rare film appearance in the comedy She'll Be Wearing Pink Pyjamas in 1985, opposite Julie Walters. She received the Time Out Critic's Choice award for her production of Mike English's Getting In in 1986.

O'Brien has also written seven detective novels: Close-Up on Death (1989), Deadly Reflection (1993), Mask of Betrayal (1998), Dead Innocent (1999), Revenge (2001), Unauthorised Departure (2003) and Every Step You Take (2004); all feature the character of Detective Inspector John Bright.

References

External links

Living people
English mystery writers
English television actresses
Actresses from Liverpool
20th-century English actresses
21st-century English actresses
Women mystery writers
English women writers
Writers from Liverpool
Year of birth missing (living people)